Maud Angelica Behn (born 29 April 2003) is a member of the Norwegian Royal Family. She is the first child of Princess Märtha Louise of Norway and her late husband Ari Behn and the eldest grandchild of King Harald V of Norway and Queen Sonja.

She came to national attention with the speech she gave at her father’s funeral, and since then has published her first book.

In 2022 she competed in the Norwegian version of the Masked Singer, Maskorama.

Birth and baptism
Maud Angelica Behn was born on 29 April 2003 at The National Hospital, a University Hospital in Oslo, Norway, where her mother had also been born. Her great-great grandmother was Maud of Wales, youngest daughter of King Edward VII of the United Kingdom.

Maud was christened at Slottskapellet, Royal Palace, Oslo, Norway on 2 July 2003, the one-hundredth birthday of her great-grandfather, King Olav V of Norway. Her godparents are her grandfather King Harald V, her uncle Crown Prince Haakon, Princess Alexandra of Sayn-Wittgenstein-Berleburg, her aunt Anja Sabrina Bjørshol, her mother's cousin Marianne Ulrichsen, the actor Kåre Conradi and the politician Trond Giske. 

She has two younger sisters, Leah Isadora Behn, born on 8 April 2005, and Emma Tallulah Behn, born on 29 September 2008.

The web site of the Norwegian royal family names the members of the family as King Harald and Queen Sonja, Crown Prince Haakon, Crown Princess Mette-Marit, Princess Ingrid Alexandra, Prince Sverre Magnus, Princess Märtha Louise, her three daughters, and Princess Astrid.

Succession to the throne
Princess Märtha Louise is the first child of King Harald and Queen Sonja, and Maud Angelica is their eldest grandchild. In 1990, the Norwegian constitution was changed, introducing full cognatic primogeniture to the Norwegian throne, so that the eldest child, regardless of sex, comes first in the line of succession. However, this change was made without displacing Crown Prince Haakon, as it only affects those born after 1989. Women born between 1971 and 1989 (in practice, only Märtha Louise), were given succession rights, but primogeniture would not apply. This was controversial, and if it were to be reversed Maud Angelica would be likely to inherit the throne in due course. At present, she is fifth in the line of succession to the Norwegian throne.

Education
The Behn family lived in Islington, London, then in New York, and finally in Lommedalen, a valley outside Oslo.

In the autumn of 2009, Maud Angelica Behn was enrolled at the Bærum Waldorf School, an independent Steiner school in Bærum, a suburb west of Oslo.

Family
On 5 August 2016, Maud Angelica’s parents began divorce proceedings, which were finalized in 2017. Ari Behn died by suicide on Christmas Day, 2019, and was buried in Oslo Cathedral.

Maud Angelica made a speech at her father’s funeral and later talked about his death. In an article devoted to the speech, Aftenposten commented "It does not get more powerful than this".

For her public thoughts on mental illness and suicide, she was awarded the Acute Psychiatry Prize for 2020. In October 2021, she published her first book, Threads of Tears, her debut as a poet and illustrator, which tells the story of a girl whose life is dark but who learns to weave the threads she cries. 
Ten thousand copies were printed, and on release the book went straight to first place on the Norwegian Booksellers Association bestseller list.

Maud regularly publishes her own drawings on Instagram. In 2021, Princess Märtha Louise stated that she was planning to move to the United States with her daughters when the COVID-19 pandemic was out of the way.

Ancestry

References

External links
3 eyed cat, Instagram profile of Maud Angelica Behn

2003 births
Living people
Norwegian children
Waldorf school alumni
Norwegian people of German descent
Norwegian people of Danish descent
Norwegian people of English descent
Norwegian people of Swedish descent